is a private junior college in Hirano-ku, Osaka, Osaka, Japan. It is located next to Tokiwakai Gakuen University. The precursor of the school was founded in 1953, and it was chartered as a university in 1964.

External links 
  

Private universities and colleges in Japan
Educational institutions established in 1953
Hirano-ku, Osaka
Universities and colleges in Osaka Prefecture
1953 establishments in Japan
Japanese junior colleges